Monita Borgohain is the Secretary to the Govt. of Assam, Director of the Dr. Bhupen Hazarika Regional Government Film and Television Institute, Secretary of the Jyoti Chitraban Film Studio, Festival Director of the Guwahati International Film Festival, and Producer of the feature film Xobdo Nixobdo Kolahol (Soul of Silence). Occasionally, she writes for journals, such as the Film Critics Circle of India Journal of Indian Cinema and the FIPRESCI-India journal.

Govt. of Assam
Monita Borgohain, studied Political Geography at Guwahati University. In May 2020, she was one of 25 Assam Civil Service officers of the 1992 and 1993 batches who were promoted with a selection grade. In Feb 2022, she was promoted from the post of Joint Secretary to the Govt. of Assam, Cultural Affairs Department, to the rank of Secretary to the Govt. of Assam, Administrative Reforms and Training, Pension and Public Grievances.

Film Festival Circuit

References

External links 

Monita Borgohain at Guwahati International Film Festival
Monita Borgohain at Kautik International Film Festival
Monita Borgohain at Chicago International Indie Film Festival

Assamese people
Festival directors
Year of birth missing (living people)
Living people